Talmei Yosef (lit. Yosef Furrows) was an Israeli settlement and moshav in the Sinai Peninsula. Located near Yamit, it was evacuated in 1982 as a result of the Camp David Accords. 

The moshav was established in 1977 by a gar'in group of immigrants from South Africa and the United States. It was named after Yosef Weitz, a former director of the Land and Afforestation Department of the Jewish National Fund.

When the settlement was evacuated, its residents founded a new moshav by the same name in the Hevel Shalom area in Israel, close to the Egypt–Gaza border.

Former Israeli settlements in Sinai
Former moshavim
Populated places established in 1977
1977 establishments in the Israeli Military Governorate
1982 disestablishments in the Israeli Military Governorate